State Highway 58 (SH 58) is a State Highway in Kerala, India that starts in Vadakkancherry and ends in Pollachi. The highway is 39 km long.

The Route Map 
Vadakkancherry – Mudappallur – Chittlancherry - Nemmara - Vattekkad(Elavancherry) – Kollengode – Kambrathchalla (Muthalamada) – Govindapuram – ending at Pollachi in Tamil Nadu

Other Names 
Mangalam Govindapuram Road, Vadakkanchery Kollengode Road

Places Connected 
Nelliyampathi is 32 km away from Junction at Nemmara
Pothundi Dam is 7 km away from the Junction at Nemmara
Parambikulam Wildlife Sanctuary is connected to Kerala by means of this highway. The Road to Parambikulam diverges from Ambrampalayam in Tamil Nadu from this Highway
The cities of Central and South Tamil Nadu, namely Madurai, Tiruchirappalli, Dindigul, Pazhani, Pollachi, Tirupur etc. were connected to Central Kerala (esp. Thrissur, Guruvayur  by means of this Highway 
Part of the road Network connecting different pilgrim centers of Tamil Nadu (Palani Murugan temple, Meenakshi Amman Temple at Madurai, Basilica of Our Lady of Good Health at Velankanni, Ramanathaswamy Temple etc.) with the pilgrim centers of Kerala (Guruvayur Temple, Sabarimala, Chottanikkara Temple, Kodungallur Bhagavathy Temple, Thriprayar Temple etc.)

Districts connected by State Highway 
Palakkad District in Kerala
Coimbatore District in Tamil Nadu

Local Bodies of Kerala connected by State Highway 
Vadakkancherry
Vandazhy
Melarcode
Ayiloor
Nemmara
Elavancherry
Kollengode
Muthalamada

Townships on the State Highway 
Nemmara
Kollengode

See also 
Roads in Kerala
List of State Highways in Kerala

References 

State Highways in Kerala
Roads in Palakkad district
Roads in Thrissur district